Morae Ebony Ruffin (born September 9, 1992), known professionally as Morray, is an American rapper and singer from Fayetteville, North Carolina. He received widespread recognition in 2020 with his debut single "Quicksand" and released his debut mixtape Street Sermons in 2021.

Early life 
Growing up in Fayetteville, North Carolina, Ruffin was raised on R&B and gospel music, singing in his local church by the age of four. He moved to Lebanon, Pennsylvania at age 12 and lived there for six years before moving back to North Carolina. While in Pennsylvania, he met a rap collective called SGS which inspired him to start making music. With stints in juvenile detention at age 19, he served jail time in his early 20s.

While raising a child, he worked construction and recorded music on the side. In 2014, he released his first song, which he recorded for his wife's birthday, and started taking music seriously. In 2020, he lost his job at a call center and chose to pursue his music career to support his three children.

Career 
In March 2020, Morray released his first music video "Quicksand", which led to his being discovered by media manager Moe Shalizi. He became Morray's manager and launched a record label called Pick Six Records. Morray also featured two more songs with Mo Chedda in 2020, "Snitch On Ya Man's" and "In Da Trap". On October 30, Morray and Shalizi re-released "Quicksand" as a single; it later charted on the Billboard Hot 100. Following the single, he received co-signs from fellow North Carolina rappers J. Cole and DaBaby. The single amassed millions of streams, and he was featured as part of Billboard's Emerging Artists Spotlight. In an interview with Billboard, he said "I want to be that light in the ghetto, I want be the person that makes you smile and shows you the hood ain't all bad. I appreciate where I came from and I know that the ghetto can bring both positive and negative memories." He released three more singles in 2020: "Switched Up", "Low Key", and "Dreamland".

In 2021, Morray released the singles "Big Decisions" and "Kingdom". On April 16, Morray announced that he had signed to Interscope Records in a joint venture with Pick Six. He released the single "Trenches" ahead of his debut project in April. His mixtape Street Sermons was released on April 28, 2021. The mixtape debuted on the US Billboard 200 at number 41. On May 14, Morray was a guest feature on J. Cole's album The Off-Season, on the song "My Life" with 21 Savage. The song debuted at number two on the Hot 100, becoming his highest charting and best performing song. Also in 2021, he was featured on the 2021 XXL Freshman Class. On June 22, it was announced he would be joining J. Cole and 21 Savage on their co-headlining The Off-Season Tour as their opener. On July 30, Morray released a remix of his song "Trenches" featuring Polo G.

Artistry 
Morray grew up listening to artists like Usher and took inspiration from Drake's rapping and singing fluidity. His style has been compared to CeeLo Green, and described as combining "the soulfulness of Big K.R.I.T. with the bounce of Outkast".

Discography

Mixtapes

Singles

As lead artist

As featured artist

Guest appearances

Tours
Supporting
 The Off-Season Tour  (2021)

References 

1992 births
Living people
21st-century American rappers
Musicians from Fayetteville, North Carolina
Rappers from North Carolina
Singers from North Carolina
Songwriters from North Carolina
Southern hip hop musicians
American hip hop singers
Trap musicians
African-American male rappers
African-American male singer-songwriters
21st-century African-American male singers